Bashkirosaurus is an extinct genus of archegosauroidean temnospondyl within the family Archegosauridae.
Locality: Belebei locality, Belebeiskii District, Bashkortostan (Bashkiry) Province, Western Cisuraly, European Russia.

See also

 Prehistoric amphibian
 List of prehistoric amphibians

References

Permian amphibians
Permian temnospondyls of Europe
Permian temnospondyls of Asia
Fossil taxa described in 1981
Prehistoric amphibian genera